Pseudopachybrachius basalis is a species of dirt-colored seed bug in the family Rhyparochromidae. It is found in the Caribbean Sea, Central America, and North America.

References

External links

 

Rhyparochromidae
Articles created by Qbugbot
Insects described in 1852